is a Japanese professional baseball infielder for the Saitama Seibu Lions in Japan's Nippon Professional Baseball (NPB).

Career
He got Pacific League Rookie of the Year in 2017, he was named as Best Nine and got Golden Glove Award in 2018.

International career 
Genda represented the Japan national baseball team in the 2017 Asia Professional Baseball Championship, 2018 MLB Japan All-Star Series and 2019 WBSC Premier12.

On October 10, 2018, he was selected Japan national baseball team at the 2018 MLB Japan All-Star Series.

On October 1, 2019, he was selected at the 2019 WBSC Premier12.

Personal
In October 2019, Genda married former Nogizaka46 member Misa Etō, whom he met when she interviewed him for a professional sports news program. He welcomed his first child, a son, on January 29, 2022.

References

External links

NPB.com

1993 births
Living people
Nippon Professional Baseball Rookie of the Year Award winners
Nippon Professional Baseball shortstops
Saitama Seibu Lions players
Baseball people from Ōita Prefecture
2019 WBSC Premier12 players
2023 World Baseball Classic players
Baseball players at the 2020 Summer Olympics
Olympic baseball players of Japan
Olympic medalists in baseball
Olympic gold medalists for Japan
Medalists at the 2020 Summer Olympics